Maharani Girls High School is a Higher Secondary school for girls located at Darjeeling, West Bengal, India.

History
The school was founded in 1908 through the efforts of Hemlata Sarkar, daughter of Sivanath Sastri, who was a Brahmo reformist. Hemlata was aided by Maharani Suniti Devi of Koch Bihar and her sister, the Maharani Sucharu Devi of Mayurbhanj, both daughters of another Brahmo reformist Keshub Chandra Sen. The maharanis funded the school and it was, therefore, was named Maharani Girls School. It was upgraded to a High School in 1911.

The school is affiliated with the West Bengal Board of Secondary Education and teaching is in Bengali, Nepali and English; Sanskrit is also taught as a subject.

Lila Majumdar, the renowned writer of children's fiction in Bangla literature taught here for the year 1930- '31.

See also
Education in India
List of schools in India
Education in West Bengal

References

External links

Schools in Colonial India
Private schools in West Bengal
Girls' schools in West Bengal
High schools and secondary schools in West Bengal
Schools in Darjeeling district
Education in Darjeeling
Educational institutions established in 1908
1908 establishments in India